Saline Island, also known as Johnson Island, in the Ohio River near Saline Landing, Illinois, has historical significance in 1862 and 1864 during the American Civil War when it was used for incursion into Illionois.  It was listed on the National Register of Historic Places in 1998.

It is located at the confluence of the Saline River with the Ohio River, at miles 865-67 of the latter, on the Illinois side of the river, but the island is part of Kentucky.

References

Kentucky in the American Civil War
1862 in Kentucky
National Register of Historic Places in Union County, Kentucky
Ohio River
American Civil War on the National Register of Historic Places
Islands of Kentucky
Borders of Kentucky
Conflict sites on the National Register of Historic Places in Kentucky
Borders of Illinois
1864 in Kentucky